Menegazzia ramulicola is a rare species of foliose lichen in the family Parmeliaceae. Found in Australia, the species was described as new to science by Australian lichenologist Gintaras Kantvilas in 2012. The specific epithet ramulicola  refers to its usual habitat, young twigs.

The medulla of Menegazzia ramulicola contains stictic acid and lecanoric acid. It has a compact thallus that envelops twigs, and has few perforations (these perforations are typically a characteristic feature of genus Menegazzia).

See also
List of Menegazzia species

References

ramulicola
Lichen species
Lichens described in 2012
Lichens of Australia
Taxa named by Gintaras Kantvilas